Fond du Lac is a town in Fond du Lac County, Wisconsin, United States, first settled in 1836. The population was 2,027 at the 2000 census. The City of Fond du Lac is located mostly within the town, although a small portion extends into adjacent towns. The name is French for "bottom of the lake", from its location at the south end of Lake Winnebago. The unincorporated community of Luco is located within the town.

Geography 
According to the United States Census Bureau, the town has a total area of 20.9 square miles (54.2 km2), of which, 19.9 square miles (51.4 km2) of it is land and 1.1 square miles (2.8 km2) of it (5.16%) is water.

Town Government 

Robert J. Giese – Town Chairman

Jens A. Jorgensen – Town Supervisor

Eric Kaufman – Town Supervisor

Patti S. Supple – Town Clerk

Education 
The town is the location of the University of Wisconsin-Fond du Lac, Marian University, and the Moraine Park Technical College. It is near the Horicon Marsh State Wildlife Area and the Horicon National Wildlife Refuge.

Culture
Fond du Lac is mentioned as a place visited in Hank Snow's 1959 hit I've Been Everywhere, famously covered by Johnny Cash.

References

External links 
 Town of Fond du Lac website

Populated places established in 1836
Towns in Fond du Lac County, Wisconsin
Towns in Wisconsin
1836 establishments in Wisconsin Territory